The 2006 Preakness Stakes was the 131st running of the Preakness Stakes thoroughbred horse race. The race took place on May 20, 2006, and was televised in the United States on the NBC television network. Bernardini, who was jockeyed by Javier Castellano, won the race by five and one quarter lengths over runner-up Sweetnorthernsaint. Approximate post time was 6:19 p.m. Eastern Time. The race was run over a fast track in a final time of 1:54.65.  The Maryland Jockey Club reported total attendance of 128,643, this is recorded as second highest on the list of American thoroughbred racing top attended events for North America in 2006.

The running of the race was marred when Barbaro, the Kentucky Derby winner, broke down early in the race and sustained injuries on his right hind leg after a false start, ending his racing career.

Payout 

The 131st Preakness Stakes Payout Schedule

 $2 Exacta: (8–7) paid $171.60
 $2 Trifecta: (8–7–3) paid $3,912.80
 $1 Superfecta: (8–7–3–5) paid $11,151.20

The full chart 

 Winning Breeder: Darley Stud; (KY)  
 Final Time: 1:54.65
 Track Condition: Fast
 Total Attendance: 128,643

References

External links 
 

2006
2006 in horse racing
Horse races in Maryland
2006 in American sports
2006 in sports in Maryland